Nils Tirén (19 August 1885, Ovikens Parish, Jämtland - 16 March 1935, Länna Parish, Uppland) was a Swedish painter and graphic artist.

Biography
He was the son of Johan Tirén and Gerda Rydberg, who were both artists. His sister, also became a painter.

After completing his basic education in Jämtland, he attended several art schools. His early works were mostly watercolors, inspired by his father's works and the animal paintings of Bruno Liljefors. As an animal painter, he spent a great deal of time making observations in nature, to catch his subjects at just the right moment. Eventually, this led him to become a prominent hunter and game manager. 

He held a joint exhibition with his mother and sister at the Konstnärshuset in 1918. A memorial exhibition of all three was held at the Liljevalchs konsthall, shortly after his death. 

His first marriage was to Agnes Charlotta Brunnberg. In 1927, he married Viola Sandström. Their son, became a music teacher and cartoonist.

References

Further reading
Svenskt konstnärslexikon Vol. V, pg. 457, Allhems Förlag, Malmö. Libris

External links

"Konstnärsfamilj flyttade till Länna" på Släkt- & soldatforskning och mycket om Roslagen
More works by Tirén @ ArtNet

1885 births
1935 deaths
Swedish painters
Animal painters
Swedish illustrators
People from Jämtland